Helmet Peak is a conspicuous peak rising to  in Levski Ridge, Tangra Mountains on Livingston Island in the South Shetland Islands, Antarctica just southward of the mouth of Huron Glacier. It is bounded by Devnya Valley to the west, Iskar Glacier to the northeast, and Magura Glacier to the southeast, and has precipitous west and east slopes. It was named by Discovery Investigations personnel during the period 1926–32.

Location

Maps
 South Shetland Islands. Scale 1:200000 topographic map. DOS 610 Sheet W 62 60. Tolworth, UK, 1968.
 L.L. Ivanov et al. Antarctica: Livingston Island and Greenwich Island, South Shetland Islands. Scale 1:100000 topographic map. Sofia: Antarctic Place-names Commission of Bulgaria, 2005.
 L.L. Ivanov. Antarctica: Livingston Island and Greenwich, Robert, Snow and Smith Islands. Scale 1:120000 topographic map. Troyan: Manfred Wörner Foundation, 2010.  (First edition 2009. )
 Antarctic Digital Database (ADD). Scale 1:250000 topographic map of Antarctica. Scientific Committee on Antarctic Research (SCAR). Since 1993, regularly updated.
 L.L. Ivanov. Antarctica: Livingston Island and Smith Island. Scale 1:100000 topographic map. Manfred Wörner Foundation, 2017. 
 A. Kamburov and L. Ivanov. Bowles Ridge and Central Tangra Mountains: Livingston Island, Antarctica. Scale 1:25000 map. Sofia: Manfred Wörner Foundation, 2023.

Gallery

Notes

References
 Helmet Peak. SCAR Composite Gazetteer of Antarctica
 

Tangra Mountains